Gao Feng (596 – January 16, 654), courtesy name Jifu, better known as Gao Jifu, posthumously known as Duke Xian of Tiao, was a Chinese official who served as a chancellor during the reigns of the emperors Taizong and Gaozong in the Tang dynasty.

Background 
Gao Jifu was born in 596.  He was from the locale that would eventually be the Tang Empire's De Prefecture (德州, roughly modern Dezhou, Shandong).  His grandfather, Gao Biao (高表), was a commandery governor during either the late Northern Wei dynasty or Northern Wei's branch successor state, Eastern Wei. His father, Gao Heng (高衡), was a county magistrate during the Sui dynasty. Gao Jifu himself was said to be both studious and trained in martial arts when he was young, and was also said to be particularly appropriate in his actions during the mourning period after his mother's death. His elder brother, Gao Yuandao (高元道), served as the magistrate of Ji County (汲縣, in modern Xinxiang, Henan). In 618 or 619, when the Sui Empire was on the verge of total collapse after the death of Emperor Yang, the people of Ji County surrendered to agrarian rebels, and Gao Yuandao was killed in the process. Gao Jifu led his brother's followers in combat and was able to capture and execute those who killed his brother, taking their heads to his brother's tomb to be offered to his brother. Thereafter, he gathered his own band of agrarian rebels. He soon submitted to the rule of the Tang dynasty, one of the regimes that rose out of the confusion of the Sui Empire's collapse, along with another rebel leader in the region, Li Yude (李育德), who had been a general of the rebel ruler Li Mi, and was made the military advisor to Li Yude, who was made the prefect of Zhi Prefecture (陟州, roughly modern Jiaozuo, Henan).

During Emperor Taizong's reign 
Gao Jifu's activities for the next several years are not recorded in history.  It was said that early in the reign of the second Tang emperor, Emperor Taizong, Gao was serving as assistant imperial censor, and he often pointed out faults of the other officials, as his duty as assistant censors, without fearing reprisals. He was eventually made a midlevel official at the legislative bureau of the government (中書省, Zhongshu Sheng). In 634, he was serving as such when, in response to Emperor Taizong's call for officials to offer suggestions, Gao offered five suggestions, in these areas:

 He suggested that greater emphasis should be paid to promoting officials who were kind and honest.
 He suggested that the conscription of people into public works projects should be reduced.
 He suggested that ways should be found to curb the tendency for princesses and nobles to conduct business to make more money, as he opined that their stipends were already sufficient.
 He suggested that local officials' salaries should be increased, as he opined that at the time the salaries were not sufficient for them to support their families.
 He suggested that clear guidelines should be established that the emperor's sons be considered lower in rank than the emperor's brothers, as it was not clear at the time, leading to confusion in how the emperor's sons and brothers dealt with each other.

Emperor Taizong praised him for his suggestions.

In 643, Gao was made an assistant head of household to the crown prince, Li Zhi. In response to further suggestions about governance that Gao suggested, Emperor Taizong awarded him with a stalactite, then used as medication, stating, "You provided medication for the state, so I am providing you with medication." In 644, he was made the assistant minister of civil service affairs, and was said to be appropriate in his selection of officials. Emperor Taizong awarded him with a gold-plated mirror to symbolize that his acts were clean and honorable.

In 645, during Emperor Taizong's campaign against Goguryeo, Emperor Taizong left Li Zhi at Ding Prefecture (定州, roughly modern Baoding, Hebei), to be in charge of logistics, assisted by a number of officials led by the chancellor Gao Shilian, and Gao Jifu was a member of Li Zhi's staff there. In 648, he was made Zhongshu Ling (中書令)—the head of the legislative bureau and a post considered one for a chancellor, and also served as minister of civil service affairs. He also participated in the editing of imperial history, and was enfeoffed as the Duke of Tiao—his home county.

During Emperor Gaozong's reign 
After Emperor Taizong died in 649, Li Zhi succeeded him (as Emperor Gaozong). In 651, Gao Jifu was made Shizhong (侍中), the head of the examination bureau of government, still a post considered for a chancellor. In 652, he also took on the additional title of advisor for Emperor Gaozong's crown prince, Li Zhong. Later, he was soon said to be forced to reduced to home rest due to an illness, and Emperor Gaozong recalled his brother, Gao Jitong (高季通), who was then the prefect of Guo Prefecture (虢州, part of modern Sanmenxia, Henan), to be the assistant minister of imperial clan affairs, so that he could attend to Gao Jifu. Gao Jifu died in 654.

Notes and references 

 Old Book of Tang, vol. 78.
 New Book of Tang, vol. 104.
 Zizhi Tongjian, vols. 194, 197, 199.

Sui dynasty people
Chancellors under Emperor Taizong of Tang
Chancellors under Emperor Gaozong of Tang
596 births
654 deaths